Kumbakonam is a city and a municipal corporation in the Thanjavur district in the Indian state of Tamil Nadu. It is located 40 kilometres from Thanjavur and 273 kilometres from Chennai. It is the headquarters of the Kumbakonam taluk of Thanjavur district.

Kumbakonam is a temple town  with many Hindu temples located in and around it. Majority of the temples are dedicated to Lord Vishnu and Lord Shiva.

12 Shiva temples are connected with Mahamaham festival which happens once in 12 years in Kumbakonam. They are Kasi Viswanathar Temple, Kumbeswarar Temple, Someswarar Temple, Nageswara Temple, Ekambareswarar Temple, Gowthameswarar Temple, Abimukeswarar Temple, Kambatta Visvanathar Temple, Banapuriswarar Temple, Kahahasteeswarar Temple, Koteeswarar Temple, and Amirthakalasanathar Temple. Of these twelve, first ten temples temples are located in Kumbakonam town itself. 

Likewise five Vishnu temples are connected with Mahamaham. They are Sarangapani Temple, Chakrapani Temple, Ramaswamy Temple, Rajagopalaswamy Temple, and Varahaperumal Temple. All these five temples are found in Kumbakonam.

Saivite Temples in Kumbakonam

Kasi Viswanathar Temple

Kashi Vishwanathar Temple is situated very close to the Mahamaham tank and another one temple is placed in Solaiyappan street. Here the main deity is Kashi Vishwanathar/Vishalakshi. The important and peculiar point about this temple is the navakanniyar, which are the 9 holy rivers.  It is believed that the mahamaham function is closely associated with the 9 presiding deities namely Ganga, Yamuna, Narmada, Saraswati, Kaveri, Godavari, Tungabhadra, Krishna and Sarayu.  Another important part is the sthala lingam present in the southern part of the temple.  It was worshipped by Ravana and is believed to grow with ages.  The temple can be accessed by alighting at the Head post office bus stop.

Adi Kumbeswara Temple

Adi Kumbheshwarar temple is the major one among the Shaivite temples and located in the centre of Kumbhakonam at Big Bazaar Street. Shri Adi Kumbheshwara is the presiding deity of Kumbhakonam and Mantrapeetheshwari Mangalambika is the lord's Consort. The temple complex is huge and has beautiful artwork. This temple comprises three Praharas and three Gopurams in the eastern, northern and western directions. It is believed that Govinda Dikshitan, the Chieftain of Achyuta Nayakar of Thanjavur, renovated this oldest temple during the 16th century. Mangala Teertham, Marriage hall and small temples for Muruga, Ganapati and Mangalambika are other major constituents of this temple.

Someswar Temple

Someswar Temple is situated in the southern portion of Sri Sarangapani temple. This temple faces east with a 5-tier Gopuram at the entrance. It also has an entrance in the south. The architectural style and element of this temple resembles the Dravidian Architecture of the 13th century of the Chola period. Arumugam and Thenar Mozhi Ammal are the other deities located in this temple complex.

Nageswaran Temple

Nageswaran Temple, is dedicated to Shiva in the guise of Nagaraja, the serpent king. Also known as "Koothandavar Kovil", it is located near the Kumbakonam old bus stand. Aditya Chola constructed this temple during the 12th century. It stands as a great marvel of Chola architecture, building technology and astronomy. The design and orientation are structured in such a way that it allows sunlight inside the temple only during the Tamil month of Chithirai (April/May), therefore, it bears another name called Surya Kottam or Keel Kottam. The Karuvarai (Sanctum Sanctorum) of Nageswaran temple is similar to that of Sarangapani Temple, as it is made in the form of a Chariot. The temple consists of three gopurams in the eastern western and southern directions.

This vast temple known is for its shrine to Rahu, one of the nine celestial bodies in the Navagraha. A legend has it that the mythological serpents Adiseshan, Dakshan and Kaarkotakan worshipped Shiva here. Legend also has it that King Nala worshipped Shiva here as in Thirunallar.

Ekambeswarar Temple

Ekambeshwarar Temple is a Hindu temple located at Kumbhakonam. It is dedicated to the Hindu god Shiva. The presiding deity is known as Ekambeshwarar also known by other names Ekamranathaswamy or simply Ekamresha. It is one of the famous Pancha-linga kshetra ( pilgrimages consisting of five Shaivite places )

Abimukeswarar Temple

Abhimukheshwarar Temple is situated in the eastern bank of the Mahamaham tank, Kumbhakonam. It is a Shiva temple. The presiding deity of the temple, in the form of Shivalinga, is known as Abhimukheshwarar. His consort is known as Amirthavalli or Amritavalli.

Gauthameswarar Temple

Gautameshwarar Temple is situated in the western bank of the Mahamaham tank, Kumbhakonam It is a Shiva temple. The presiding deity of the temple, in the form of Shivalinga, is known as Gautameshwarar. His consort is known as Saundaryanayaki.

Kambatta Viswanathar Temple

Kambatta Viswanathar Temple is a Hindu temple located at Kumbakonam at the south west of Kumbeswarar Temple. It is dedicated to the Hindu god Shiva. The presiding deity is known as Kambatta Viswanathar.

Banapuriswarar Temple

Banapuriswarar Temple is a Hindu temple located in the town of Kumbakonam. It is dedicated to the Hindu god Shiva. The presiding deity is known as Banupuriswarar.

Kalahasteeswarar Temple

Kalahasteeshwarar Temple is a Shiva temple located at Kumbhakonam. The presiding deity is known as Kalahasteeshwaraswamy . His consort is known as Gnanambikai. The temple was renovated during the period of Serfoji or Sharabhoji ( śarabhōji ) .

Kottaiyur Kodeeswarar temple

Kottaiyur Kodeeswarar ( ot koteeshwarar ) Temple (:ta:கொட்டையூர் கோடீஸ்வரர் கோயில்) is a Hindu temple dedicated to Shiva, located in Kottaiyur, a village in the outskirts of Kumbakonam, in Thanjavur district in Tamil Nadu, India. Shiva is worshipped as Koteeswarar and his consort Parvathi as Pandhadu Nayaki. Koteeswarar is revered in the 7th century Tamil Shaiva canonical work, the Tevaram, written by Tamil saint poets known as the Nayanmars and classified as Paadal Petra Sthalam, the 275 temples revered in the canon.

Amirthakadeswarar Temple, Sakkottai

Amirthakadeswarar Temple (:ta:சாக்கோட்டை அமிர்தகலேசுவரர் கோயில்) dedicated to the deity Shiva, located at Sakkottai. As per Hindu legend, the essence of creation arrived at this place in a pot (locally called kalayam), the place came to be known as Kalayanallur. Shiva is worshiped here as Amirthakadeswarar. His consort Parvati is depicted as Amirthavalli Amman. The presiding deity is revered in the 7th century Tamil Saiva canonical work, the Tevaram, written by Tamil saint poets known as the Nayanmars and classified as Paadal Petra Sthalam.

Vaishnavite Temples in Kumbakonam

Sarangapani Temple

Of the many temples in Kumbakonam, the most striking is the Lord Sarangapani Temple, a Vaishnavite temple. This famous pancharanga kshetram is in the midst of the busy market place. Before the Sri Rangam Temple gopuram (tower) was built, this temple used to hold the place for the tallest Temple Tower in South Asia.

Chakrapani Temple

Chakrapani Temple is situated about 1.5 km North of Ramaswamy Temple. Here the main deity is Chakraraja. The Sudarshana Chakra is also here. The temple is also an exquisite exponent of the early temple architecture. The important and peculiar point about this temple is that Vilva (Bilwa) archana which is normally performed in Shiva temples is also performed here for the Perumal (Lord Vishnu).

Ramaswamy Temple

The Ramaswamy Temple which depicts the paintings of Ramayana is another important Vaishanavite temple in Kumbakonam. The greatness of Ramaswamy Temple is said to be the only temple where Lord Rama, Goddess Sita are in the same platform and Lord Hanuman is playing the veena instead of reading the Ramayana. The entire deity is said to be made from Saligrama monolith. The Temple is filled with intricate carvings in its pillars.This temple is known as " Thennaga Ayodheyai " which means Ayodhys of south.

Rajagopalaswamy Temple

The Rajagopalaswamy temple is situated at Big Street in Kumbakonam. The presiding deity is known as Rajagopalaswamy. His consort is known as Sengamalavalli.

Varahaperumal Temple

The Varahaperumal Temple is situated at Kumbakonam. The presiding deity is known as Varahaperumal. His consort is known as Boomidevi.

Specialty 
Twelve Shiva temples are connected with Mahamaham festival which happens once in 12 years in Kumbakonam. They are:
Kasi Viswanathar Temple, 
Kumbeswarar Temple, 
Someswarar Temple, 
Nageswara Temple, 
Kaalahasteeswarar Temple, 
Gowthameswarar Temple, 
Koteeswarar Temple, 
Banapuriswarar Temple, 
Abimukeswarar Temple, 
Kambatta Visvanathar Temple,
Ekambareswarar Temple and
Amirthakalasanathar Temple

Five Vishnu temples are connected with Mahamaham festival which happens once in 12 years in Kumbakonam. They are:
Sarangapani Temple, 
Chakrapani Temple, 
Ramaswamy Temple, 
Rajagopalaswamy Temple, and 
Varahaperumal Temple.

Other temples in Kumbakonam

Sri Vijayeendra Tirtha Moola Brindavanam

We can find the moola brindavanam of Sri Vijayeendra Tirtha (Raghavendra Swamy guru's guru) here.
It is in Solaiyappan Street. The great Vijayeendra Tirtha's Aradhana falls on Jyeshta Trayodashi. He was one of the greatest scholar what India has produced. He was a staunch Vishnu bhakta and a great philosopher. He was an exponent of 64 vidyas.

Sri SitaRama Bhavani Sankarar Temple

This temple is situated at Solaiyappan street on the banks of the Cauvery river (Nangam Thirunal Padithurai). This private temple is supposed to be more than 200 years old built by Achalpuram Shri.Lakshmana shrowthigal's (great scholar of Krishna Yajur Veda)son Indore Shri.Subba Rao Lakshmana Dravid. In this temple deities are Sri Rama, Shiva (Sankara) in the form of Bhana lingam and Parvathi (Bhavani) are in separate sannithis. Rama, Lakshmana, Sita, and Hanuman are made of white marbles. This ramar (called Solaiappan Agraharam Ramaswamy) is one of the twelve deities in the Akshya trithi celebrations in Kumbakonam. This temple was managed by  Late. Smt. Rajalakshmi(Ramarkoil Rajalakshmi Ammal, daughter of late Shri.Subba Rao (II) Son of Shri.Ramachandra Rao Dravid) till 2013. The temple is currently managed by all the children and grandchildren of Late Shri. Subba Rao (II) Dravid alias Subramanya Iyer & Late Saraswathi Ammal family. Several Hindu religious saints use to come here to do chaturmasya. Paramahamsa Siva Prakasa Anandagiri Swamigal stayed in this temple did his tapas and puja for quite a number of times and got information at the entrance of the temple to travel to Thiruviyaru to attain mukthi. Similarly, he did and attained mukthi at Thiruviyaru. Hanuman in this temple has a knife, gatha, bow & arrow at the back and japamala in his hand doing Ramajapam. Rama with jadamudi and knife(valkaram)at hip and marauri (dress) and kothdhandam in his hand.

Sri Rama Bhajanai Sabha
Sri Rama Bhajanai Sabha founded and nurtured by Venuganam Sri Sarabha Sastri about 125 years ago. It is in Solaiappan Street. Every year sabha celebrates Sri Rama Navami Utasavam and Sri Radha Kalyana Mahotsavam and committed to its various cultural and religious needs of the Hindu society with the grace of Lord Rama.

Temples around Kumbakonam

Thirunageswaram Temple
Thirunageswaram is located 8 km east of Kumbakonam. There are two major temples at Thirunageswaram. One the famous Vaishnavaite temple of Oppliyappan (Oppliyappan Sannadhi) (the Venkatesh Perumal of Tirupathi), the other the ThiruNageswarar or NagaNathaswami (Naga in Tamil/Sanskrit means Snake and Natha means God) temple for Shaivaites.
An important rite of this temple is that of Rahu bhagawan sannathi where milk abhishekham is performed daily during Rahukaalam. At this time, milk that is poured on the statue is supposed to turn blue when it passes over the body, and back to white after it reaches the floor. This is watched by many daily during the raahu kaalam. This is also the only place wherein one can view Rahu bhagawan with his consorts.

Pateeswaram temple

Sri Thenupureeswarar temple at Pateeswaram, 5 km south-east of  Kumbakonam, was  constructed during the 16th century by Govinda Dikshithar, a Minister of Nayak King Acchathappa.

Airavatesvara Temple

The temple at Darasuram, 4 km west of Kumbakonam is Airvatesvara (Airavat is the holy white elephant) Temple, constructed by Rajaraja Chola II  (1146–63), is a superb example of 12th-century Chola architecture. Many statues were removed to the art gallery in the Thanjavur Palace, but have since been returned. The remarkable structures depict, among other things, Shiva as Kankala-murti - the mendicant. Stories from epics and Hindu mythology are depicted. Adjoining the Airavatesvara temple is the Deiva Nayaki Ambal temple.
In 2004 the Archaeological Survey of India (ASI) excavated and restored the temple.

Navagraha Temples
The area surrounding Kumbakonam is home to a set of Navagraha temples dating 
from the Chola period.

Swamimalai temple

The Lord Murugan temple is located in Swami Malai, which is around 10 km from kumbakonam. It is located on the main road connecting Kumbakonam and Thanjavur. It is one among the six famous temples (Arupadai Veedu) of Lord Muruga. This is the place where the Lord murugan in childhood taught the meaning of mandra "OM" to his father Lord Siva. Lord Murugas Fourth home.

Thiruvalanjuzhi Vinayakar Temple

This siva temple is famous for vinayakar sculpture which has been carved from white foam while churning the milky sea. So the name of the god in Tamil is "Vellai pillayar" meaning that "White vinayakar". This temple is located in small village "Thiruvalansuzi" which is 4 km from Kumbakonam and 2 km from Swamimalai. The name "Thiruvalansuzi" has come because the Cauvery river prayed the lord Siva by doing pradhaksana from right hand side to left hand side. (Usually it will be left to right). The name for lord Siva in this temple is "Sadai mudi nathar".

Tribhuvanan or tirubhuvanan Sharabheshwarar Temple
Shri Kampa-hareshwarar ( God who makes one rid of quaking sensation ) is the main deity,Sharabheshwarer, a form of Shiva is the presiding deity of the temple. Particularly , worshipping the deity at 4.30-6.00 pm on Sundays is special. as only on Sundays , time between 4.30 pm to 6.00 pm is known as rahu-kaalam or rahu-kaal.

Thirucherai Temples
Thirucherai is a beautiful village which is 15 km from Kumbakonam. Sri Saranatha Perumal Temple and Sara Parameswarar temple are popular here.

References